Catt or CATT may refer to:

People
Alfred Catt (1833–1919), Australian parliamentarian
Anthony Catt (1933–2018), English cricketer
Carrie Chapman Catt (1859–1947), American women's suffrage leader
Helena Catt, New Zealand public servant and academic
Ian Catt (fl. 1990s), British record producer and musician
Mike Catt (born 1971), English rugby player
Nathan Catt (born 1988), English rugby union player

Acronyms 
 Center for Advanced Transportation Technology, at the University of Maryland
 Centre d'Analyse Théorique et de Traitement, an economics research organisation at the University of Pau, France
 China Academy of Telecommunications Technology, a Chinese institute
 Combined Arms Tactical Trainer, a British Army training installation
 New York State Center for Advanced Technology in Telecommunications, at Polytechnic Institute of New York University

See also 
Sidney J. Catts (1863–1936), American politician

 Catto (disambiguation)
 Cat
 Kett